James Karen (born Jacob Karnofsky; November 28, 1923 – October 23, 2018) was an American character actor of Broadway, film and television. Karen is  known for his roles in Poltergeist, The China Syndrome, Wall Street, The Return of the Living Dead, Invaders from Mars and The Pursuit of Happyness, but was perhaps best known as the signature pitchman for Pathmark, famously appearing in commercials for the now-defunct East Coast-based supermarket chain from the late 1970s to the early 1990s which earned his nickname "Mr. Pathmark".

Karen is also known for his recurring television role as Tom Bradford's boss, Eliot Randolph, in Eight Is Enough.  He was nominated for a Saturn Award for his 1985 role in The Return of the Living Dead. He also appeared in an episode of Cheers as Frasier's mentor and the father of Carla's sixth child.

Early life
Karen was born Jacob Karnofsky in Wilkes-Barre, in northeastern Pennsylvania, the son of Russian-born Jewish immigrants Mae (née Freed) and Joseph H. Karnofsky, a produce dealer. His uncle was Morris Carnovsky, a prominent actor and co-founder of the Group Theatre.

As a young man, Karen was encouraged to be an actor by U.S. Democratic Congressman Daniel J. Flood, who was an amateur thespian himself, recruiting him into a production at the Little Theatre of Wilkes-Barre. He attended the Neighborhood Playhouse School of the Theatre in New York. Karen also served in the U.S. Army Air Forces during World War II.

Career
Karen's big break came when he was asked to understudy Karl Malden in the original Broadway production of A Streetcar Named Desire.

On television, he played Dr. Burke on As the World Turns and was the original Lincoln Tyler on All My Children. He was perhaps best known for his recurring role on the television series Eight Is Enough. He is also well-known on the East Coast for his 20 years as television and radio spokesman for the Pathmark supermarket chain. On the streets of New York, Karen was known as  "Mr. Pathmark".

Karen appeared in an episode of the 1977 NBC situation comedy The Kallikaks, and played Earl Silbert in the 1979 miniseries Blind Ambition, and M*A*S*H season 11, episode 12 on 1/23/83. A decade later, he appeared in an episode of The Golden Girls as a prospective love interest for Dorothy. He is also known for having played Herbert Purcell, a businessman and leader of a local Ku Klux Klan chapter, in a 1981 episode of The Jeffersons; and the evil tycoon Nathan Lassiter, who killed the town of Walnut Grove in the final TV movie of Little House on the Prairie. Karen was a lifelong member of The Actors Studio. Karen's other notable film credits include The China Syndrome and Oliver Stone's Wall Street.

Perhaps his best known roles were in the low-budget horror comedy The Return of the Living Dead, where Karen starred as the manager of a medical warehouse who inadvertently releases a gas that re-animates the dead, and in Poltergeist where he played the real-estate developer who built the California planned community of Cuesta Verde on top of a former cemetery.

In a 2006 interview about his role in The Return of the Living Dead, Karen noted that he helped write most scenes for his character: “It was the deal where he figures out he’s becoming a zombie and decides to incinerate himself in the crematorium...He kisses his wedding ring as he goes in. It was a very emotional scene, but it also got me out of being one of the rain-drenched zombies milling around outside the place at the end of the film. I didn't really want to do all that muddy stuff".

Karen was set to appear in Superman Returns (2006) as Ben Hubbard, but his scenes were ultimately cut. Later in his career, Karen was recognized for his role as Martin Frohm in the 2006 film The Pursuit of Happyness. His final film roles were in the low-budget films Bender (2016) and Cynthia (2018).

Personal life
He was married to Susan Reed, the actress and folk singer, with whom he had one son, Reed. Reed's godfather was Buster Keaton, Karen's good friend. Karen and Reed divorced in 1967. He married Alba Francesca in 1986.

Karen died on October 23, 2018, at his home in Los Angeles, at the age of 94.

Selected filmography
Sources:

 Film (1965, Short) as Passerby
 Frankenstein Meets the Space Monster (1965) as Dr. Adam Steele
 Hercules in New York (1970) as Professor Camden
 I Never Sang for My Father (1970) as Old Age Home Director
 Rivals (1972) as Child Psychiatrist
 Amazing Grace (1974) as Mr. Annenberg
 All the President's Men (1976) as Hugh Sloan's Lawyer
 Something for Joey (1977, TV Movie) as Dr. Wingreen
 Mary Jane Harper Cried Last Night (1977, TV Movie) as Dr. Sutterman
 The Gathering (1977, TV Movie) as Bob Block
 Capricorn One (1978) as Vice President Price
 Opening Night (1977) as Bellboy
 F.I.S.T. (1978) as Mr. Andrews
 Institute for Revenge (1979, TV Movie) as Power Broker
 The China Syndrome (1979) as Mac Churchill
 The Jazz Singer (1980) as Barney Callahan
 Take This Job and Shove It (1981) as Loomis
 Poltergeist (1982) as Mr. Teague
 Time Walker (1982) as Dr. Wendell J. Rossmore
 Frances (1982) as Judge Hillier
 Kiss Me Goodbye (1982) as Lawyer (uncredited)
 Sam's Son (1984) as Mr. Collins
 The Boy Who Loved Trolls (1984, TV Movie) as Richman
 The Return of the Living Dead (1985) as Frank Johnson
 Jagged Edge (1985) as Andrew Hardesty
 Invaders from Mars (1986) as General Climet Wilson
 Hardbodies 2 (1986) as Logan
 Billionaire Boys Club (1987, TV Movie) as Mr. Fairmont Sr.
 Wall Street (1987) as Mr. Lynch
 Return of the Living Dead Part II (1988) as Ed Mathews
 Girlfriend from Hell (1989) as Carl's Dad
 Vital Signs (1990) as Dean of Students
 Road Lawyers and Other Briefs (1990) as Judge Bowelmore (segment "Road Lawyers")
 The Willies (1990) as Uncle Harry / Mr. Jenkins
 The Closer (1990) as Ned Randall
 Heart of the Deal (1990)
 The Unborn (1991) as Dr. Richard Meyerling
 Stone Soup (1993) as Paul
 Future Shock (1994) as Kafka
 Revenge of the Nerds IV: Nerds in Love (1994, TV Movie) as Mylan Whitfield
 Congo (1995) as College President, Elliot's Boss
 Piranha (1995) as Governor
 Nixon (1995) as Bill Rogers
 Up Close & Personal (1996) as Tom Orr
 Behind Enemy Lines (1997) as TV Reporter
 Always Say Goodbye (1997) as William Tager
 Joyride (1997) as The Client
 A River Made to Drown In (1997) as Ray
 Freedom Strike (1998) as President Mitchell
 Shadow of Doubt (1998) as Norman Calloway
 Girl (1998) as Dad
 Apt Pupil (1999) as Victor Bowden
 One Last Flight (1999) as Gramps
 My Last Love (1999) as Phil Morton
 Any Given Sunday (1999) as Christina's Advisor
 Thirteen Days (2000) as George Ball
 Mulholland Drive (2001) as Wally Brown
 A House on a Hill (2003) as Sy
 Unscripted (2005, TV Series) as Dante's Friend
 Superman Returns (2006) as Ben Hubbard (Scenes Deleted)
 Outlaw Trail: The Treasure of Butch Cassidy (2006) as Leroy Parker
 The Pursuit of Happyness (2006) as Martin Frohm
 Trail of the Screaming Forehead (2007) as Reverend Beaks
 Dark and Stormy Night  (2009) as Seyton Ethelquake
 Jack and the Beanstalk (2009) as Verri Saddius
 Sympathy for Delicious (2010) as Father Rohn
 The Butterfly Room (2012) as Taxidermist
 Ambush at Dark Canyon (2012) as Seymour Redfield
 America's Most Haunted (2013) as Ralph George
 Rain from Stars (2013) as Spencer
 Bender (2016) as Old Man Bender
 Confessions of a Teenage Jesus Jerk (2017) as Interviewee No. 1
 Cynthia (2018) as Frank Teague

Awards
Karen was nominated for a Saturn Award for Best Actor for his role in The Return of the Living Dead in 1985. For his contributions to the horror film industry, Karen received an honorary Saturn Award in 1998. He was nominated for a Fangoria Chainsaw Awards for Best Supporting Actor for his role in The Unborn in 1991.

References

Further reading
 Voisin, Scott, Character Kings: Hollywood's Familiar Faces Discuss the Art & Business of Acting. BearManor Media, 2009. .

External links
 
 
 Great Character Actors / James Karen

1923 births
2018 deaths
American male stage actors
American male film actors
American male television actors
American people of Russian-Jewish descent
Jewish American male actors
Male actors from Pennsylvania
Actors from Wilkes-Barre, Pennsylvania
20th-century American male actors
21st-century American male actors
United States Army Air Forces personnel of World War II
21st-century American Jews